Pabstiella trifida is a species of orchid plant.

References 

trifida